Isaac Lester (1875-1956) was mayor of Murray, Utah from 1923 to 1929. He was Murray's first mayor to serve three terms. Lester defeated incumbent Charles Anderson. Lester's term was noted for improving a lighting system for the city and offering a contract through Utah Power and Light Company for the service. He was a member of the fraternal order Woodmen of the World. Prior to his election, he was a Sergeant in 4th Regimental Cavalry in the Spanish–American War and was a chief in the Murray fire department.

References 

1875 births
1956 deaths
Mayors of Murray, Utah